is a professional football (soccer) club based in Maebashi, Gunma Prefecture in Japan. The club currently play in the J2 League, the Japanese second tier of professional football.

History 
The club was founded in 1995 in Kusatsu, one of the most well-known spa resorts in Japan, in 1995 as Liaison Kusatsu Football Club. The players were the students of specialized training college Higashi Nihon Soccer Academy. When the school was closed in 1999 due to financial difficulties, the players decided to stay in Kusatsu and keep the club alive. In 2002, the club was incorporated as K.K. Kusatsu Onsen Football Club with a future promotion to J. League in mind and adopted new team name , meaning "The Spa, Kusatsu".

Because of J. League restrictions on stadiums, they play at Shoda Shoyu Stadium Gunma (Shikishima Athletics Stadium) in nearby Maebashi, the prefectural capital since the club was promoted to J. League Division 2 from 2005 season.

From 1 February 2013, the club has adopted the new name as "Thespakusatsu Gunma", to give the impression of the club as a representative of entire Gunma Prefecture, while still leaving the name of "Kusatsu" in it, as well as the logo of the club as it is.

After 12 years spent at J2 League, Thespakusatsu Gunma was relegated to the J3 League for the first time in their history, having finished as the last-placed team on the 2017 J2 League. Gunma returned to J2 League ahead of the 2020 season, being promoted back to the J2 after two years spent in J3.

Record as J. League member 

Key

Current squad 
As of 8 January 2023; Squad for the 2023 season.

Out on loan

Coaching staff
For the 2023 season.

Managerial history

Kit evolution

References

External links 
Official Site 

 
J.League clubs
Football clubs in Japan
Association football clubs established in 1995
Sports teams in Gunma Prefecture
1995 establishments in Japan
Japan Football League clubs